Prochlorococcus is a genus of very small (0.6 μm) marine cyanobacteria with an unusual pigmentation (chlorophyll a2 and b2). These bacteria belong to the photosynthetic picoplankton and are probably the most abundant photosynthetic organism on Earth. Prochlorococcus microbes are among the major primary producers in the ocean, responsible for a large percentage of the photosynthetic production of oxygen. Prochlorococcus strains, called ecotypes, have physiological differences enabling them to exploit different ecological niches. Analysis of the genome sequences of Prochlorococcus strains show that 1,273 genes are common to all strains, and the average genome size is about 2,000 genes. In contrast, eukaryotic algae have over 10,000 genes.

Discovery
Although there had been several earlier records of very small chlorophyll-b-containing cyanobacteria in the ocean, Prochlorococcus was discovered in 1986 by Sallie W. (Penny) Chisholm of the Massachusetts Institute of Technology, Robert J. Olson of the Woods Hole Oceanographic Institution, and other collaborators in the Sargasso Sea using flow cytometry. Chisholm was awarded the Crafoord Prize in 2019 for the discovery. The first culture of Prochlorococcus was isolated in the Sargasso Sea in 1988 (strain SS120) and shortly another strain was obtained from the Mediterranean Sea (strain MED). The name Prochlorococcus originated from the fact it was originally assumed that Prochlorococcus was related to Prochloron and other chlorophyll-b-containing bacteria, called prochlorophytes, but it is now known that prochlorophytes form several separate phylogenetic groups within the cyanobacteria subgroup of the bacteria domain. The only species within the genus described is Prochlorococcus marinus, although two subspecies have been named for low-light and high-light adapted niche variations.

Morphology
Marine cyanobacteria are to date the smallest known photosynthetic organisms; Prochlorococcus is the smallest at just 0.5 to 0.7 micrometres in diameter. The coccoid shaped cells are non-motile and free-living. Their small size and large surface-area-to-volume ratio, gives them an advantage in nutrient-poor water. Still, it is assumed that Prochlorococcus have a very small nutrient requirement. Moreover, Prochlorococcus have adapted to use sulfolipids instead of phospholipids in their membranes to survive in phosphate deprived environments. This adaptation allows them to avoid competition with heterotrophs that are dependent on phosphate for survival. Typically, Prochlorococcus divide once a day in the subsurface layer or oligotrophic waters.

Distribution
Prochlorococcus is abundant in the euphotic zone of the world's tropical oceans. It is possibly the most plentiful genus on Earth: a single millilitre of surface seawater may contain 100,000 cells or more. Worldwide, the average yearly abundance is  individuals (for comparison, that is approximately the number of atoms in a ton of gold).  Prochlorococcus is ubiquitous between 40°N and 40°S and dominates in the oligotrophic (nutrient-poor) regions of the oceans.  Prochlorococcus is mostly found in a temperature range of 10-33 °C and some strains can grow at depths with low light (<1% surface light). These strains are known as LL (Low Light) ecotypes, with strains that occupy shallower depths in the water column known as HL (High Light) ecotypes. Furthermore, Prochlorococcus are more plentiful in the presence of heterotrophs that have catalase abilities. Prochlorococcus do not have mechanisms to degrade reactive oxygen species and rely on heterotrophs to protect them. The bacterium accounts for an estimated 13-48% of the global photosynthetic production of oxygen, and forms part of the base of the ocean food chain.

Pigments
Prochlorococcus is closely related to Synechococcus, another abundant photosynthetic cyanobacteria, which contains the light-harvesting antennae phycobilisomes. However, Prochlorochoccus has evolved to use a unique light-harvesting complex, consisting predominantly of divinyl derivatives of chlorophyll a (Chl a2) and chlorophyll b (Chl b2) and lacking monovinyl chlorophylls and phycobilisomes. Prochlorococcus is the only known wild-type oxygenic phototroph that does not contain Chl a as a major photosynthetic pigment, and is the only known prokaryote with α-carotene.

Genome
The genomes of several strains of Prochlorococcus have been sequenced. Twelve complete genomes have been sequenced which reveal physiologically and genetically distinct lineages of Prochlorococcus marinus that are 97% similar in the 16S rRNA gene.

The high-light ecotype has the smallest genome (1,657,990 basepairs, 1,716 genes) of any known oxygenic phototroph, but the genome of the low-light type is much larger (2,410,873 base pairs, 2,275 genes).

Ecology
Ancestors of Prochlorococcus contributed to the production of early atmospheric oxygen. Despite Prochlorococcus being one of the smallest types of marine phytoplankton in the world's oceans, its substantial number make it responsible for a major part of the oceans', world's photosynthesis, and oxygen production. The size of Prochlorococcus (0.5 to 0.7 μm) and the adaptations of the various ecotypes allow the organism to grow abundantly in low nutrient waters such as the waters of the tropics and the subtropics (c. 40°N to 40°S); however, they can be found in higher latitudes as high up as 60° north but at fairly minimal concentrations and the bacteria's distribution across the oceans suggest that the colder waters could be fatal. This wide range of latitude along with the bacteria's ability to survive up to depths of 100 to 150 metres, i.e. the average depth of the mixing layer of the surface ocean, allows it to grow to enormous numbers, up to 3×1027 individuals worldwide. This enormous number makes the Prochlorococcus play an important role in the global carbon cycle and oxygen production. Along with Synechococcus (another genus of cyanobacteria that co-occurs with Prochlorococcus) these cyanobacteria are responsible for approximately 50% of marine carbon fixation, making it an important carbon sink via the biological carbon pump (i.e. the transfer of organic carbon from the surface ocean to the deep via several biological, physical and chemical processes). The abundance, distribution and all other characteristics of the Prochlorococcus make it a key organism in oligotrophic waters serving as an important primary producer to the open ocean food webs.

Ecotypes 
Prochlorococcus has different "ecotypes" occupying different niches and can vary by pigments, light requirements, nitrogen and phosphorus utilization, copper, and virus sensitivity. It is thought that Prochlorococcus may occupy potentially 35 different ecotypes and sub-ecotypes within the worlds' oceans. They can be differentiated on the basis of the sequence of the ribosomal RNA gene. It has been broken down by NCBI Taxonomy into two different subspecies, Low-light Adapted (LL) or High-light Adapted (HL). There are six clades within each subspecies.

Low-light adapted 
Prochlorococcus marinus subsp. marinus is associated with low-light adapted types. It is also further classified by sub-ecotypes LLI-LLVII, where LLII/III has not been yet phylogenetically uncoupled. LV species are found in highly iron scarce locations around the equator, and as a result, have lost several ferric proteins. The low-light adapted subspecies is otherwise known to have a higher ratio of chlorophyll b2 to chlorophyll a2, which aids in its ability to absorb blue light. Blue light is able to penetrate ocean waters deeper than the rest of the visible spectrum, and can reach depths of >200 m, depending on the turbidity of the water. Their ability to photosynthesize at a depth where blue light penetrates allows them to inhabit depths between 80 and 200 m. Their genomes can range from 1,650,000 to 2,600,000 basepairs in size.

High-light adapted 
Prochlorococcus marinus subsp. pastoris is associated with high-light adapted types. It can be further classified by sub-ecotypes HLI-HLVI. HLIII, like LV, is also located in an iron-limited environment near the equator, with similar ferric adaptations. The high-light adapted subspecies is otherwise known to have a low ratio of chlorophyll b2 to chlorophyll a2.  High-light adapted strains inhabit depths between 25 and 100 m. Their genomes can range from 1,640,000 to 1,800,000 basepairs in size.

Metabolism 
Most cyanobacterium are known to have an Incomplete Tricarboxylic Acid Cycle (TCA). In this process, 2-oxoglutarate decarboxylase (2OGDC) and succinic semialdehyde dehydrogenase (SSADH), replace the enzyme 2-oxoglutarate dehydrogenase (2-OGDH). Normally, when this enzyme complex joins with NADP+, it can be converted to succinate from 2-oxoglutarate (2-OG). This pathway is non-functional in Prochlorococcus, as succinate dehydrogenase has been lost evolutionarily to conserve energy that may have otherwise been lost to phosphate metabolism.

Strains 

Table modified from

See also
 Photosynthetic picoplankton
 Pelagibacter
 Synechococcus

References

Further reading

External links

The Most Important Microbe You've Never Heard Of: NPR Story on Prochlorococcus
 Anacyte Laboratories
Genome Information for Prochlorococcus marinus: National Center for Biotechnology Information.

 tp://mepaper.livehindustan.com/imageview_13218_104275458_4_54_17-05-2019_i_1.pagezoomsinwindows.php-

Synechococcales
Environmental microbiology
Monotypic bacteria genera
Cyanobacteria genera
Marine microorganisms